Azib Ally-Haniff (born 8 November 1978) is a Guyanese cricketer. He played in eleven first-class matches for Guyana from 1998 to 2002.

See also
 List of Guyanese representative cricketers

References

External links
 

1978 births
Living people
Guyanese cricketers
Guyana cricketers